Ryszard Wołągiewicz (19 June 1933 – 14 January 1994) was a Polish archaeologist. He was director of National Museum, Szczecin for many years and a well known specialist on the Pre-Roman Iron Age and Roman Iron Age in East-Central Europe.

Biography
Ryszard Wołągiewicz was born in Vilnius on 19 June 1933. His father Fabian Wołągiewicz (1908–1940) was murdered in the Katyn massacre along with other prominent male members of the family, and in June 1940 Ryszard and his mother and brother were deported by the Soviet Union to the Komi Republic. They returned to Poland in 1946, and Wołągiewicz graduated from high school in Choszczno in 1952.

In 1952, Wołągiewicz started studying archaeology at the Adam Mickiewicz University in Poznań, gaining his MA in 1956 with a thesis on the Hallstatt culture. He subsequently worked at the National Museum, Szczecin, and was appointed director in 1980. The research of Wołągiewicz centered on the Pre-Roman Iron Age and Roman Iron Age in East-Central Europe. He was the author of many publications on these subjects. He gained a PhD in 1993 with a thesis on the ceramics of the Wielbark culture.

Wołągiewicz died in Szczecin on 14 January 1994. The museum Muzeum Ziemi Choszczeńskiej, founded in 1994, is dedicated to Wołągiewicz.

Selected works
 Uwagi do zagadnienia stosunków kulturowych w okresie lateńskim na Pomorzu Zachodnim, „Materiały Zachodnio-Pomorskie", t. V, 1959.
 Oblicze kulturowe osadnictwa Pomorza Zachodniego u progu naszej ery, „Munera archaeologica Iosepho Kostrzewski (...)", Poznań 1963.
 Uzbrojenie ludności Pomorza Zachodniego u progu naszej ery „Materiały Zachodnio-Pomorskie", t. IX, 1963 (z żoną Marią Danutą).
 Napływ importów rzymskich do Europy na północ od środkowego Dunaju, „Archeologia Polski", t. 15, 1970.
 Kręgi kamienne w Grzybnicy, Koszalin 1977.
 kilka rozdziałów w pracy zbiorowej Prahistoria Ziem Polskich, tom V, 1981.
 Ceramika kultury wielbarskiej między Bałtykiem a Morzem Czarnym, Szczecin 1993.

See also
 Andrzej Kokowski
 Mark Shchukin
 Marek Olędzki
 Jerzy Kolendo
 Anders Kaliff
 Michel Kazanski
 Kazimierz Godłowski

Sources

 
 Brzustowicz B., Brzustowicz G., 1996, Inauguracha Muzeum Ziemi Choszczeńskiej, „Nadwarciański Rocznik Historyczno-Archiwalny”, t. 3, s. 250–255.

1933 births
1994 deaths
Adam Mickiewicz University in Poznań alumni
People from Vilnius
People from Wilno Voivodeship (1926–1939)
20th-century Polish archaeologists